Prokopiou is a Greek surname. Notable people with the surname include:

George Prokopiou (born 1956), Greek shipowner
Georgios Prokopiou (1876–1940), Greek artist, photographer, and documentary filmmaker

Greek-language surnames